Birk Centerpark railway halt is a railway halt serving the district of Birk in the eastern part of the city of Herning in Jutland, Denmark. The halt serves several businesses, educational institutions and a residential area for students in the eastern part of Herning.

Birk Centerpark station is located on the Skanderborg–Skjern line. The station opened in 1997. It offers direct regional train services to Aarhus, Skjern and Struer operated by Arriva.

See also
 List of railway stations in Denmark

References

Citations

Bibliography

External links

 Banedanmark – government agency responsible for maintenance and traffic control of most of the Danish railway network
 Arriva – British multinational public transport company operating bus and train services in Denmark
 Danske Jernbaner – website with information on railway history in Denmark

Railway stations opened in 1997
Railway stations in the Central Denmark Region
Railway stations in Denmark opened in the 20th century